Homalopoma bicolor is a species of sea snail, a marine gastropod mollusk in the family Colloniidae.

Distribution
This marine species occurs off Japan.

References

 Okutani T. (2001). Six new bathyal and shelf Trochoidean species in Japan. Venus 60(3): 121-127

External links

Colloniidae
Gastropods described in 2001